Simon Jones Murphy Jr. was Mayor of Green Bay, Wisconsin.

Biography
Murphy was born Simon Jones Murphy Jr. on March 27, 1851 in Maine.  His father was Simon J. Murphy Sr., a prominent lumberman. He attended primary school in Bangor, Maine and moved with his family to Detroit, Michigan in 1866 before graduating from the Lawrence Scientific School. Murphy married Helena Bogardus Platt and the couple had five children. Murphy moved to Green Bay in 1886. He died on September 1, 1926.

Career
Murphy was Mayor from 1899 to 1901. He made a living by running a sawmill.

References

1851 births
1926 deaths
Businesspeople in timber
Politicians from Bangor, Maine
Politicians from Detroit
Mayors of Green Bay, Wisconsin
Harvard School of Engineering and Applied Sciences alumni